Davenport Avenue is an active light rail station in the city of Newark, Essex County, New Jersey. The station, located at the dead end of Davenport Avenue in the Upper Roseville section of the city, services NJ Transit's Newark Light Rail on trains between Grove Street in Bloomfield to Newark Penn Station. Davenport Avenue station contains two side platforms along with pedestrian access to Branch Brook Park. 

Davenport Avenue station opened on May 26, 1935, with the opening of the Newark City Subway between Broad Street (now Military Park) and Heller Parkway stations (now part of the Branch Brook Park station).

References

External links

 Davenport Avenue entrance from Google Maps Street View

Newark Light Rail stations
Railway stations in the United States opened in 1935
1935 establishments in New Jersey